Chondrothyrella is a genus of land snails with an operculum, terrestrial gastropod mollusks in the family Pomatiidae.

Species 
Species within the genus Chondrothyrella include:
Chondrothyrella assimilis (Gundlach in Pfeiffer, 1863)
Chondrothyrella claudicans (Poey, 1851)
Chondrothyrella cuzcoensis Torre & Bartsch, 1938
Chondrothyrella excisa (Gundlach in Pfeiffer, 1863)
Chondrothyrella ottonis (Pfeiffer, 1846)
Chondrothyrella paredonis Sánchez Roig, 1951
Chondrothyrella perturbata Torre & Bartsch, 1938
Chondrothyrella petricosa (Morelet, 1851)
Chondrothyrella pudica (d’Orbigny, 1842)
Chondrothyrella tenebrosa (Morelet, 1849)

References 

Pomatiidae